Results of the 1989 Sri Lankan general election by electoral district.

Number of votes

1. EROS contested as an independent group in four districts (Batticaloa, Jaffna, Trincomalee and Vanni).

Percentage of votes

1. EROS contested as an independent group in four districts (Batticaloa, Jaffna, Trincomalee and Vanni).

Seats

1. EROS contested as an independent group in four districts (Batticaloa, Jaffna, Trincomalee and Vanni).

See also
Results of the 1989 Sri Lankan general election by province

References
 

1989 Sri Lankan parliamentary election
Election results in Sri Lanka